Ahmad Hazwan bin Bakri (born 19 June 1991) is a Malaysian professional footballer who plays as a forward for Malaysia Super League side Johor Darul Ta'zim and the Malaysia national team.

Club career

Kuala Lumpur 
Hazwan began his career at Kuala Lumpur after being discovered by Kuala Lumpur's scout Akram Hadid on a scouting mission to Labuan. He played for Kuala Lumpur youth team before being promoted to the first team.

Johor Darul Ta'zim 
On 13 December 2016, Hazwan signed a two-year contract with Johor Darul Ta'zim for an undisclosed fee. Press at the time reported the transfer value at figures between US$60,000 and US$100,000.

On 20 January 2017, Hazwan made his league debut in a 1–1 draw against Kedah. He played for 43 minutes before being replaced with Jerónimo Barrales. Hazwan scored his first league goal in a 1–2 defeat over Perak on 18 February 2017.

International career

Youth 
In 2011, Hazwan was called up to play for Malaysia U23. He made his Malaysia U23 debut on 13 December 2011 playing against Sydney FC. He scored two goals to ensure a 3–0 win for Malaysia with K. Gurusamy scoring the other.

Senior 
On 28 April 2012, Hazwan made his debut for the senior team, scoring a hat-trick against Sri Lanka in a friendly match as Malaysia ran out 6–0 victors. Hazwan became the youngest player to score a hat trick for Malaysia.

Career statistics

Club 

1 Includes AFC Cup and AFC Champions League.

International

International goals 
As of match played 6 June 2016. Malaysia score listed first, score column indicates score after each Hazwan goal.

Honours

Club 
Selangor
 Malaysia Cup: 2015

Johor Darul Ta'zim
 Malaysia Super League (5): 2017, 2018,2019,2020,2021
 Malaysia Cup (2): 2017, 2019
 Malaysia Charity Shield (5): 2018, 2019,2020,2021,2022
 Malaysia FA Cup(1): 2022

Individual 
 National Football Awards: 2016

References

External links 
 
 Hazwan Bakri at FA Selangor
 Hazwan Bakri  at Johor Darul Ta'zim F.C.

Malaysian footballers
Malaysia international footballers
Kuala Lumpur City F.C. players
People from Labuan
Malaysian people of Malay descent
Malaysian people of Bruneian descent
Living people
1991 births
Footballers at the 2014 Asian Games
Selangor FA players
Malaysia Super League players
Association football forwards
Asian Games competitors for Malaysia